Francisco Asorey González (4 March 1889 – 2 July 1961) was a Spanish sculptor. Born in Cambados, Galicia, he was one of the most important Spanish sculptors of the early 20th century. He studied and began work as a religious sculptor in Sarrià, Barcelona, and continued in Barakaldo, Basque Country. He lived and worked in Madrid from 1909 to 1918; then in Santiago de Compostela, Galicia, until his death in 1961.

Images

References

Sources
 El escultor Francisco Asorey, Ramón Otero Túñez, Universidad de Santiago de Compostela, 1959

1889 births
1961 deaths
Sculptors from Galicia (Spain)
20th-century Spanish sculptors
20th-century Spanish male artists
Spanish male sculptors
People from Pontevedra